Xu Yue may refer to:
 Xu Yue (mathematician)
 Xu Yue (footballer)